Judith Brown (December 17, 1931 – May 11, 1992) was an American dancer and a sculptor who was drawn to images of the body in motion and its effect on the cloth surrounding it. She welded crushed automobile scrap metal into energetic moving torsos, horses, and flying draperies. "One of the things that made Judy stand out as an artist was her ability to work in many different mediums. Some of this was by choice, and sometimes it was by necessity. Her surroundings often dictated what medium she could work with at any given time. After all, you can't bring you're welding gear with you to Rome."

Education
Brown attended Sarah Lawrence College in Yonkers, New York (B.A., 1954), where she learned to weld from her teacher, Theodore Roszak, a pioneering abstract expressionist sculptor.

Commissions
Source:
 Mural Sculpture, Lobby, Louisville Radio Station WAVE
 Fountain, commissioned by Architectural Interiors, New York City
 Model, designed and executed for Festival of 'I\\To Worlds, Spoleto, Italy
 Sculpture, designed for Electra Film Productions, NYC
 Noah's Ark, exhibited at Bronx Zoo, New York City, at Rochester Museum and Science Center, Rochester, New York, and at Hopkins Center, Hanover, New Hampshire
 Store Windows, executed Tiffany & Company Windows, New York City, Christmas 1957, 1959, 1962, October 1969, Spring 1979, and October 1980
 Wall Sculptures: for Youngstown Research Center (1963-4), commissioned by Youngstown Steel Company, Youngstown, Ohio; for Hecht and Company, Landmark Shopping Center, Alexandria, Virginia, Daniel Schwartzman, Architect; for Lobby, 570 Seventh Avenue, New York City, Giorgio Cavaglieri, Architect; for Lobby, Cities Service Company's New Research Center, Cranbury, New Jersey; for Ottauquechee Health Center, Woodstock, Vermont
 Eternal Lights: for Congregation Beth-El, South Orange, New Jersey; for Congregation Sharey Thfilo, East Orange, New Jersey
 Menorahs: commissioned by Architect Fritz Nathan for the Permanent Collection of the Jewish Museum, New York City; commissioned by Smith College for the Helen Hill Chapel, Northampton, Massachusetts; commissioned by Jules Scherman, of Wisteria Press, Inc., New York City
 Altar Cross, commissioned by Smith College for the Helen Hill Chapel, Northampton, Massachusetts
 Landscape, Memorial Piece for Gustave Heller, YM-YWCA, Essex County, New Jersey
 Memorial Plaque for Robert A. Ferguson, Westchester County Airport, Purchase, New York
 Sculpture for Vice President's office, Atlantic Richfield Company, New York City
 Bronze Relief Sculpture for Gymnasium Lobby, South Richmond High School, Staten Island, New York, Daniel Schwartzman, Architect
 Poster, Stratton Arts Festival, Stratton, Vermont
 Medallion, commissioned by Brandeis University National Women's Committee, New York City
 Model for Fountain for the Plaza at Windsor, Vermont
 Bronze Sculpture, commissioned by Intramural, Inc. for Building Lobby, N/E Cor. 79th Street and Second Avenue, New York City
 Presentation Piece, commissioned by Graphic Arts Associates of Delaware Valley, Philadelphia, Pennsylvania
 Wall Mural, Noah's Ark, Roosevelt Hospital, New York City
 1977: Designed and executed Hanes Hosiery "Million Dollar Award"; Designed and executed "Old Spice" Smart Ship Award
 1978: Commissioned to design and execute the "Walter White Award" for the NAACP for presentation to Hubert Humphrey; Commissioned to design and execute the Award for the Honorees of the National Board YWCA's First Tribute to Women in International Industry
 1979: Designed and executed Jewelry for the Museum of Modern Art, New York City; Designed and executed limited edition of Mazuzas for Brandeis University-National Women's Committee, New York City
 1980: Bronze Cross (6 x 3 foot! commissioned for St. James Episcopal Church, Woodstock, Vermont
 1982: Eubie Award, New York Chapter of the National Academy of Recording Arts and Sciences
 1985: Two Sculptures, Marriott Hotel, Orlando, Florida
 1986: Two large Sculptures for indoor reflecting pools, Palm Desert Hotel, Palm Springs, California; John Portman, Eight Sculptures for Peachtree Plaza Hotel, Atlanta, Georgia; John Portman, Beach House, Sea Island, Georgia
 1987: Loan Installation, DeCordova Museum, Lincoln, Massachusetts
 1988: Eleven foot outdoor Sculpture for Front Plaza, River Court, Charles River, East Cambridge, Massachusetts, H. J. Davis Development Corp.; Tomie dePaola, Outdoor Sculpture of Bird, New London, New Hampshire
 1989: Room Screen, 51/2 feet, Rita Moreno, Los Angeles, California; Martha Graham Award for presentation to her in Boston, Massachusetts
 1990: Fireplace Screen, Sharon Mills, Chattanooga, Tennessee

Selected exhibitions

1957: "The Patron Church", Museum of Contemporary Crafts, New York City
1958: Dallas Museum of Art, Dallas, Texas; The Jewish Museum, New York City
1959: Detroit Institute of Arts; Pennsylvania Academy of the Fine Arts, Philadelphia
1962: National Academy of Arts and Letters, New York City
1963: Arkansas Arts Center, Little Rock, Arkansas; Newport Art Association, Newport, Rhode Island
1964: "West Side Artists", Riverside Museum, New York City; "The Crafts and Worship", Dallas Museum of Art, Dallas, Texas; Hopkins Center, Dartmouth College, Hanover, New Hampshire
1966: "Recent Acquisitions", Aldrich Museum of Contemporary Art, Ridgefield, Connecticut; Byron Gallery, New York City
1967: Byron Gallery, New York City; Southern Vermont Art Center, Manchester, Vermont; University of New Hampshire, Durham, New Hampshire
1968: New Britain Museum of American Art, New Britain, Connecticut; "Exhibit of Encaustic Drawings", Kanegis Gallery, Boston, Massachusetts
1969: Graham Gallery, New York City
1970: "Birds and Beasts", Graham Gallery, New York City
1971: Art Gallery of Ontario, Toronto
1972: Brandeis University, Waltham, Massachusetts; SUNY, Plattsburgh, New York
1973: Fairleigh Dickinson University, William Penn Memorial Museum, Harrisburg, Pennsylvania; Sculpture in Tiffany & Co. Windows, New York City
1974: DeCordova Museum, Lincoln, Massachusetts; Hopkins Center, Dartmouth College, Hanover, New Hampshire; Library Art Center, Newport, New Hampshire
1975: "New England Women", DeCordova Museum, Lincoln, Massachusetts; "Animal Sculpture", New Britain Museum of American Art, New Britain, Connecticut; "From Vermont: Past to Present", Gallery 641, Washington, D.C.; Art Association of Newport, Rhode Island; Brattleboro Museum and Art Center, Brattleboro, Vermont
1976: The 41st International Eucharistic Congress, Philadelphia, Pennsylvania; Montshire Museum, Hanover, New Hampshire
1977: Group Show sponsored by Artists Equity, Union Carbide Building, New York City; Institute for the Arts of the Archdiocese of Washington, Gallery Kormendy, Alexandria, Virginia; Contemporary Arts Gallery, Loeb Student Center, New York University, New York City
1979: "Judaica II" sponsored by the YM-YWHA of Metropolitan New Jersey, West Orange, New Jersey; Special Exhibition of Sculpture, Tiffany and Company, New York City; The Brattleboro Museum, Brattleboro, Vermont; Fleming Museum, University of Vermont, Burlington, Vermont; Visual Artists' Coalition, Connecticut College for Women
1980: One man shows: New York University, Contemporary Arts Gallery, Washington Square Park, New York City; St. Gaudens Museum, Cornish, New Hampshire; Tiffany and Company Windows, New York City; Group Show: "The Figure", sponsored by Pratt Institute
1983: One Man Shows: Howard Monroe Gallery, Chapel Hill, North Carolina; Alwin Gallery, London; Group shows: "Regional Selections", Hood Museum of Art, Dartmouth College, Hanover, New Hampshire
1983/5: Participant in Outdoor Sculpture Installation at Rose Hill Campus, Fordham University, New York City
1984: Helen Day Art Center, Stowe, Vermont
1985: DeCordova Museum, Lincoln, Massachusetts; Hopkins Center, Dartmouth College, Hanover, New Hampshire (Best in Show Award)
1986: The Women's Museum, Washington, D.C. (Sculpture acquired for permanent collection)
1987: Tiffany's Windows, Tiffany and Co., New York City
1988: One Man Show: Southern Vermont Art Center, Manchester, Vermont
1989: One man show: National Museum of Dance, Saratoga Springs, New York; Group Show: 4th International Contemporary Art Fair, London; Tiffany's Windows, Tiffany and Co., New York City
1990: National Museum of American Jewish History, Philadelphia, Pennsylvania

Permanent collections
Pepsi Company, Pepsi Co. Sculpture Gardens, Purchase, New York
Cabot Foundations, Boston, Massachusetts
Verlaime Foundations, New Orleans, Louisiana
Marriott Corporation, Orlando, Florida
Marriott Corporation, Palm Desert Hotel, Palm Springs, California
Memorial Art Gallery, Rochester, New York
Evansville Museum, Evansville, Indiana
Riverside Museum, New York City
Aldrich Contemporary Art Museum, Ridgefield, Connecticut
Cuernavaca Cathedral, Cuernavaca, Mexico
Dartmouth College, Hanover, New Hampshire
Bundy Art Gallery, Waitsfield, Vermont
Dallas Museum of Art, Dallas, Texas
Museum of Modern Art, New York City
Vermont Law School, South Royalton, Vermont (purchased "Don Quixote" for their permanent collection)
Widener University Museum of Art, Chester, Pennsylvania (received "Mountain and Steeples" for their permanent collection as a gift of Mr. and Mrs. Meyer P. Potamkin)
Gallery Kormendy, Alexandria, Virginia
Jewish Museum, New York City
DeCordova Museum, Lincoln, Massachusetts (sculpture)
Brooklyn Museum, Brooklyn, New York (sculpture)
National Bank of Boston, Boston, Massachusetts (2 ink and watercolor drawings)
National Museum of Dance, Saratoga Springs, New York (large Athena)

Awards
1958: Honorable Mention, Gold Medal Competition, Architectural League of New York City
1959: Frank J. Lewis Award at Tenth Annual Christocentric Arts Festival, Newman Foundation, University of Illinois
1964: Sculpture Award at Silvermine Guild of Artists' 5th New England Exhibition
1967: Silvermine Guild of Artists' Finch Award for Sculpture at 18th Annual New England Competition
1970: Louis Comfort Tiffany Foundation on Award, New York City
1974: Honorable Mention, Friends of Hopkins Center Exhibit, Hanover, New Hampshire
1976: Award for Creative Work in Art: The National Academy of Arts and Letters, New York City; Best in Show Award: "Vermont Artists '76", Brattleboro Museum, Brattleboro, Vermont; Sculpture Award: Wadsworth Atheneum, Connecticut Academy of Fine Arts, Hartford, Connecticut; Best in Show Award: Saenger National Jewelry and Small Sculpture Exhibit, University of Southern Mississippi, Hattiesburg, Mississippi
1986: Best in Show Award: Hopkins Center, Hanover, New Hampshire

Notes

References
 Smithsonian Institution Research Information System; Archival, Manuscript and Photographic Collections, Judith Brown

Further reading
 Charlotte Steifer Rubinstein American Women Sculptors, A History of Women Working in Three Dimensions (G.K. Hall & Co., Boston, MA, 1990) 
 Peter H. Falk; Audrey M. Lewis; Georgia Kuchen; Veronika Roessler Who was who in American art, 1564-1975 : 400 years of artists in America (Madison, CT : Sound View Press, 1999) ,

External links
Judith Brown biography from askart.com (with image of "River God")
View sculptures and drawings by Judith Brown from judithbrown.com

1931 births
1992 deaths
20th-century American painters
Modern painters
Painters from New York City
American female dancers
Dancers from New York (state)
Sarah Lawrence College alumni
20th-century American sculptors
20th-century American women artists
Sculptors from New York (state)
20th-century American dancers